or Takeshiuchi no Sukune was a legendary Japanese hero-statesman of the 1st century, and a Shinto kami.

He is recorded in Japan's earliest literary texts, the Kojiki (ca. 712) and the Nihon Shoki (720).

Life 
Descended from Emperor Kōgen, Takenouchi no Sukune served under five legendary emperors, Emperor Keikō, Emperor Seimu, Emperor Chūai, Emperor Ōjin, and Emperor Nintoku, but was perhaps best known for his service as Grand Minister (Ōomi) to the Regent Empress Jingū, with whom he supposedly invaded Korea. While Jingu was regent to her son, Ojin, Takenouchi was accused of treason. He underwent the "ordeal of boiling water" as a way to prove his innocence.

In addition to his martial services to these emperors, he was reputedly also a saniwa, or spirit medium.

He is said to have been the grandson of HIkofutsuoshinomakoto in the Nihon Shoki, where as the Kojiki states that he was the son of Hikofutsuoshinomakoto.

Legacy 
Twenty-eight Japanese clans are said to be descended from Takenouchi no Sukune, including Takeuchi and Soga. He is a legendary figure, and is said to have drunk daily from a sacred well, which helped him live to be 280 years old. He is enshrined as a Kami at the Ube shrine, in the Iwami district of the Tottori Prefecture and at local Hachiman shrines.

His portrait has appeared on the Japanese yen, and dolls of him are popular Children's Day gifts.

First convertible silver yen bill (1889-1958)
First five yen bill (1899-1939)
Third five yen bill (1916-1939)
Second one-yen bill (1943-1958)
Second 200 yen bill (1945-1946)

Family
 Father: Yanushioshiotakeogokoro-no-mikoto (屋主忍男武雄心命, ?–?)
 Mother: Yamashita no Kage-hime (影媛), sister of Kiinokuni no Miyatsukuko Uzuhiko (Ujihiko) (山下影日売)
 Wife(s): unknown
 Son: Hata no Yashiro (羽田矢代, ?–?), ancestor of the Hata clan (波多氏).
 Son: Kose no Okara (許勢小柄, ?–?), ancestor of the Kose clan (巨勢氏).
 Son: Soga no Ishikawa (蘇我石川, ?–?), ancestor of the Soga clan (蘇我氏).
 Son: Heguri no Tsuku (平群木菟, ?–?), ancestor of the Heguri clan (平群氏).
 Son: Ki no Tsuno (紀角, ?–?), ancestor of the Ki clan (紀氏).
 Daughter: Kume no Matio-hime (久米能摩伊刀比売, ?–?)
 Daughter: Nonoiro-hime (怒能伊呂比売, ?–?)
 Son: Kazuragi no Sotsuhiko (葛城襲津彦, ?–?), ancestor of the Katsuragi clan (葛城氏).
 Son: Wakugo no Sukune (若子宿禰)

Artwork

External links
 Encyclopedia of Shinto: Biographical note
 Tsukioka Yoshitoshi: Ukiyo-e image (1883)
 Nippon Kindai Banknote:Banknote portrait (1916)
 Takenouchi no Sukune Meets Dragon King of the Sea, Dallas Museum of Art, bronze sculpture:

References 
Takenouchi no Sukune
Takenouchi no Sukune
Takenouchi no Sukune
Hachiman faith
84 births
Year of death unknown